Dumitru Răducanu (born 19 July 1967) is a retired Romanian rowing coxswain. He competed at the 1984, 1992 and 2000 Olympics and won a gold, a silver and a bronze medal. At the world championships he won one gold, three silver and two bronze medals between 1985 and 1999. Răducanu took up rowing in 1982, and after retiring from competitions in 2000 worked as a rowing coach.

References

External links 

 
 
 

1967 births
Living people
Romanian male rowers
Coxswains (rowing)
Rowers at the 1984 Summer Olympics
Rowers at the 1992 Summer Olympics
Rowers at the 2000 Summer Olympics
Olympic rowers of Romania
Olympic gold medalists for Romania
Olympic silver medalists for Romania
Olympic bronze medalists for Romania
Olympic medalists in rowing
Medalists at the 1992 Summer Olympics
Medalists at the 1984 Summer Olympics
World Rowing Championships medalists for Romania